Port Reitz (alternatively spelled Portreitz) is a district of Mombasa, Kenya, and is located north-west of the island. It was named after Lieutenant J. J. Reitz, an officer in the Royal Navy, who became commander or resident of Mombasa in February 1824.

Mombasa Airport 
Port Reitz is the location of Moi International Airport, the second largest airport in Kenya.  The dual-runway airport was originally named Port Reitz Airport.

Port Reitz Hospital 
At the end of the main Port Reitz road is the Port Reitz District Hospital.  The hospital operates a mental institute, a children's hospital and prosthetics centre.  A funeral director is located opposite the hospital complex.  The road leading to the complex has come under political criticism due to the neglect of upkeep.

Transport 
Port Reitz is reached by matatu from Mombasa island. Although Port Reitz is a matatu terminus, shared taxis to Migadini are within walking distance.

References 

Populated places in Coast Province
Mombasa